The Independence Cup was a football competition that took place in Gozo, Malta.

The cup holders in 2010 were Victoria Hotspurs who won the cup after beating Sannat Lions  7–0 in the 2009 final at the newly refurbished Sannat Ground. This competition was played on a knock-out basis between the clubs of the First Division. The first Independence Cup took place in the season 1964–1965 — that is the same year that Malta gained its independence. Generally the final was held on the Independence Day – that is 21 September.

Format 
Six teams of the First Division were chosen by lot to participate in the preliminary round. The winning three teams would join the remaining team and would participate in the semi-finals of the competition.

Cup Winners 
Here is a complete list of the past champions of the Independence Cup.

2011–2012 Xewkija Tigers
2010–2011 SK Victoria Wanderers
2009–2010 Victoria Hotspurs
2008–2009 Victoria Hotspurs
2007–2008 Nadur Youngsters 
2006–2007 Nadur Youngsters 
2005–2006 Nadur Youngsters 
2004–2005 Nadur Youngsters 
2003–2004 Xewkija Tigers 
2002–2003 Ghajnsielem 
2001–2002 Nadur Youngsters
2000–2001 Xewkija Tigers 
1999–2000 Żebbuġ Rovers
1998–1999 Sannat Lions 
1997–1998 Victoria Hotspurs 
1996–1997 Sannat Lions
1995–1996 Nadur Youngsters 
1994–1995 Nadur Youngsters 
1993–1994 Nadur Youngsters
1992–1993 Xewkija Tigers 
1991–1992 Xagħra United 
1990–1991 Xagħra United
1989–1990 Nadur Youngsters
1988–1989 Xagħra United 
1987–1988 Ghajnsielem
1986–1987  was not held 
1985–1986  was not held 
1984–1985  was not held 
1983–1984  was not held 
1982–1983  was not held 
1981–1982  was not held 
1980–1981  was not held 
1979–1980  was not held 
1978–1979  was not held 
1977–1978  was not held 
1976–1977  was not held 
1975–1976  was not held 
1974–1975  was not held 
1973–1974  was not held 
1972–1973  was not held 
1971–1972  Ghajnsielem
1970–1971  Ghajnsielem 
1969–1970  Ghajnsielem
1968–1969  was not held 
1967–1968  Nadur Youngsters
1966–1967  was not held 
1965–1966  Ghajnsielem
1964–1965  Victoria Hotspurs

External links 
 Gozo FA

Football cup competitions in Malta
Football competitions in Gozo